Aberdeen Schools Rowing Association (ASRA) was founded in 1960 by Robert Newton and Bryan Steel. It thrives today on the banks of the River Dee, Aberdeen, in Scotland. The club is affiliated to Scottish Rowing.

History
ASRA has been very successful in National competitions since 1960 and has won medals at 3 major competitions in Britain.

In 2007 ASRA was awarded a grant from the Big Lottery Fund which allowed ASRA to employ their first paid coach, purchase boats for beginners, ergometers for schools and a minibus and towing vehicle. ASRA is expanding and hoping to build an extension to the current boathouse which was constructed in 2001.  This is due to the huge increase in members due to the success of the "Wet Start" and "Dry Start" schemes.

ASRA is run by 3 trustees: Bryan Steel, Alan Lawrie and Ian Duncan.  They oversee the running of the club and take up roles as Rowing Co-ordinator, Treasurer and Senior Coach respectively. ASRA FP Colin Wallace was the first full-time paid coach and was employed by ASRA from 2007 to 2012. When Colin moved off to Edinburgh to train as a PE teacher, he was replaced by Sportscotland appointee, Jonny Muir, whose daunting remit it is, firstly to encourage more of ASRA's top rowers to follow the GB pathway, secondly to increase participation at all age levels in the club and thirdly to try to cut back the high levels of drop-out in the first years of rowing.

ASRA athletes Miles Beeson and Robert Powell were selected to compete for Great Britain in the 2- event at the 2018 World Rowing Junior Championships in Račice, Czech Republic and ranked 7th overall by winning the B Final.  In 2019, the feat was repeated in the Women's 2- at the 2019 World Rowing Junior Championships in Tokyo Bay, Japan by ASRA athletes Abagail Topp and Megan Hewison.

Honours

British champions

See also
Scottish Rowing

References

Rowing clubs in Scotland
Sport in Aberdeen
School sport in the United Kingdom
Youth sport in Scotland
1960 establishments in Scotland
Sports clubs established in 1960
Scholastic rowing in the United Kingdom